The 2019–20 Notre Dame Fighting Irish men's basketball team represented the University of Notre Dame during the 2019–20 NCAA Division I men's basketball season. The Fighting Irish were led by 20th-year head coach Mike Brey and played their home games at Edmund P. Joyce Center in South Bend, Indiana as seventh-year members of the Atlantic Coast Conference.

The Fighting Irish finished the season 20–12, and 10–10 in ACC play.  The team was scheduled to play Virginia in the quarterfinals of the ACC tournament before the tournament was cancelled due to the COVID-19 pandemic.  The NCAA tournament and NIT were also cancelled due to the pandemic.

Previous season
The Fighting Irish finished the 2018–19 season 14–19, 4–14 in ACC play to finish in a tie for last place. As the No. 15 seed in the ACC tournament, they defeated Georgia Tech in the first round before losing to Louisville in the second round.

Offseason

Departures

Incoming transfers

2019 recruiting class
No recruits.

Roster

Schedule and results

Source:

|-
!colspan=12 style=|Exhibition

|-
!colspan=12 style=| Regular season

|-
!colspan=12 style=| ACC tournament

Rankings

*AP does not release post-NCAA Tournament rankings

References

Notre Dame Fighting Irish men's basketball seasons
Notre Dame
Notre Dame Fighting Irish men's basketball
Notre Dame Fighting Irish men's basketball